Crassispira girgillus is an extinct species of sea snail, a marine gastropod mollusk in the family Pseudomelatomidae, the turrids and allies.

Description

Distribution
Fossils have been found in Eocene strata in Ile-de-France, France

References
Notes

Bibliography
 Cossmann (M.), 1889 Catalogue illustré des coquilles fossiles de l'Éocène des environs de Paris (4ème fascicule). Annales de la Société royale Malacologique de Belgique, t. 24, p. 3-385
 Cossmann (M.), 1902 Catalogue illustré des coquilles fossiles de l'Éocène des environs de Paris (3ème appendice). Annales de la Société royale Malacologique de Belgique, t. 36, p. 9-110
 Cossmann (M.) & Pissarro (G.), 1913 Iconographie complète des coquilles fossiles de l'Éocène des environs de Paris, t. 2, p. pl. 46-65
 Le Renard (J.) & Pacaud (J.-M.), 1995 Révision des Mollusques paléogènes du Bassin de Paris. 2 - Liste des références primaires des espèces. Cossmanniana, t. 3, vol. 3, p. 65-132

External links
 Pacaud J.M. & Le Renard J. (1995). Révision des Mollusques paléogènes du Bassin de Paris. IV- Liste systématique actualisée. Cossmanniana. 3(4): 151-187

girgillus
Gastropods described in 1899